Hieronymus van Alphen (8 August 1746 in Gouda – 2 April 1803 in The Hague), a jurist in Utrecht, Leiden and The Hague, is especially remembered as a poet, particularly for his poems for children under the title Kleine gedigten voor kinderen (Utrecht 1778-1782).

Van Alphen was appointed as Treasurer-General of the Dutch Republic in June 1793 but, as an Orangist, was relieved of his position as a result of the  Batavian Revolution in 1795.

Van Alphen’s children’s poems express a modern vision of children for his time. As these booklets were a great success, they were reprinted dozens of times and also translated into French, German, English, West Frisian and in the Malay language. Composers as Bartholomeus Rulofs, Ernst Christian Graf and Christian Friedrich Ruppe put them to music.

The affably poet Hieronymus van Alphen considers children as pure and innocent creatures, to whom virtues as obedience, esteem for their parents and for God, as well as modesty could be taught. Van Alphen was of the opinion that children should be able to learn playfully.

References

Sources

External links

 
 
 

1746 births
1803 deaths
Dutch children's writers
Dutch male poets
People from Gouda, South Holland
Treasurers-General